Eric Collins (born June 16, 1969) is a play-by-play sports announcer, currently the voice of the NBA's Charlotte Hornets on Bally Sports South.

Education 
Born in Cleveland, Ohio, Collins is a graduate of St. Lawrence University. He earned a master's degree from Syracuse University's S. I. Newhouse School of Public Communications in 1992.

Career 
In 2002, Collins filled-in for Mike Tirico on College Football on ABC along with analyst Irving Fryar.

From 2009 through 2013, Collins served as the part-time television voice of the Los Angeles Dodgers, taking over the duties of Dodger radio voice Charley Steiner, who was the team's play-by-play announcer on road telecasts calling games east of Phoenix.

Collins' broadcasting experience also includes play-by-play for NBC Sports' coverage of the USA Baseball team during the Beijing 2008 Summer Olympics, as well as calling ESPN's coverage of college football, college basketball, and college baseball and softball Super Regional tournaments and Women's College World Series games (WCWS in 2005 and 2006); part-time announcing for the Chicago White Sox in 2004 and 2008; and working in Minor League Baseball for the Schaumburg Flyers and Rochester Red Wings. He is known for his extreme and exciting calls during Hornets games in the 2020-2021 season. 

He also worked as a sideline reporter for Chicago Bulls broadcasts from 1997 to 2002. Collins has broadcast every game of the World Cup of Softball on ESPN since its inception in 2005, with partner Michele Smith. In August 2010, the Big Ten Network announced that Collins would handle play-by-play duties in college football and basketball. He also does play-by-play announcing for Fox College Hoops. He was the announcer for the famous Stephen F. Austin Lumberjacks men's basketball's win over Duke in Cameron Indoor Stadium on November 26, 2019. His call for the buzzer beating layup by Nathan Bain was "BAAAIINNN... YES! THE LUMBERJACKS HAVE DONE IT!"

On August 27, 2015, Collins was named the new television play-by-play announcer for the Charlotte Hornets, replacing Steve Martin, who returned to his original role as the team's radio play-by-play voice. Collins was joined by former Hornet Dell Curry and Stephanie Ready, the NBA's first full-time female analyst.

In 2021, Eric called the 2021 The Basketball Tournament alongside long-time TBTR analyst Fran Fraschilla.

References

External links
 Dodgers.com bio 
 Collins on ESPN's The Lowe Post Show podcast

1969 births
Living people
Chicago Bulls announcers
Chicago White Sox announcers
College basketball announcers in the United States
College football announcers
Los Angeles Dodgers announcers
Major League Baseball broadcasters
National Basketball Association broadcasters
Television personalities from Cleveland
St. Lawrence University alumni
S.I. Newhouse School of Public Communications alumni
Olympic Games broadcasters
Women's college basketball announcers in the United States
Women's National Basketball Association announcers
Softball announcers